Nana-Kofi Siriboe (born March 2, 1994) is an American actor and model. He is best known for his role as Ralph Angel Bordelon on the television series Queen Sugar (2016–present). He has also appeared in films such as The Longshots (2008) and Girls Trip (2017).

Life and career
Born Nana-Kofi Siriboe in Los Angeles, California to Koshie Mills and Kwame Siriboe. His parents are of Ghanaian descent. He is the middle child and has two brothers, actors Kwame Boateng and Kwesi Boakye. 
As a model, Siriboe signed with Wilhelmina Models and Vision Los Angeles. He made his professional acting debut in the film The Longshots (2008). He later appeared in the films Prom (2011), Whiplash (2014) and Straight Outta Compton (2015). On television, he had a recurring role on the comedy-drama series Awkward from 2014 to 2015.

Since 2016, Siriboe has starred on the drama series Queen Sugar, for which he gained attention and three consecutive NAACP Image Award nominations. He was subsequently cast in the hit film Girls Trip (2017).

Filmography

Film

Television

Music videos

Awards and nominations

References

External links

1994 births
Living people
21st-century American male actors
Male actors from Los Angeles
American people of Ghanaian descent
American male child actors
American male film actors
American male television actors